

Ships 
The Sri Lankan Naval fleet consists of around fifty combat vessels, support ships and inshore patrol craft. This is a list of the current Sri Lankan Navy ships as of 2022:

Equipment

Shipboard weapon systems 

 Gabriel anti-ship missile 
 PJ33A 100 mm dual gun naval artillery
 Oto Melara 76 mm naval artillery
 Typhoon Naval Optronic Stabilized Weapon Platform
 CRN 91 Naval Gun
 Type 76 dual 37 mm automated antiaircraft artillery
 Type 61 shipboard antiaircraft artillery
 Type 58 antiaircraft gun
 M242 Bushmaster 25 mm (25x137mm) chain-fed autocannon
 Heckler & Koch GMG 40 mm automatic grenade launcher
 M2 Browning machine gun

 EMGEPRON 47mm saluting gun (ceremonial gun salutes)

Specialized land vehicles
 Unibuffel mine-protected APC
 Unicorn mine-protected APC
 Ideal Motors Combat All-Terrain Vehicles.

Rocket artillery
Type 63 multiple rocket launcher

Radar systems
Raytheon's HFSWR-503 (High-Frequency Surface Wave Radar) Sea Search System
Mark 92 Guided Missile Fire Control System - SLNS Gajabahu

Mortars
 Type 84 (W84) 82 mm mortar  
 Type 89 60 mm mortar

Small arms

Handguns
 Beretta M9 pistol

Assault rifles
 Type 56-2 assault rifle
 Type 81 rifle
 M16 assault rifle
 M4 Carbine 
 QBZ-95
 SAR 21

Submachine guns
 H&K MP5 submachine gun
 Sterling submachine gun

Sniper rifles
 Dragunov sniper rifle
 Heckler & Koch SG3 sniper rifle

Machine guns
 PK machine gun (Chinese version of Russian PKM)
 Type 56 LMG (Chinese version of Russian RPD)

Grenade launchers
 M203 grenade launcher
 Milkor MGL

Rocket launchers
 RPO-A Shmel man-portable rocket launcher
 Type 69 RPG rocket launcher (Chinese version of RPG-7)

Shore establishments

Main shore establishments
SLNS Parakrama (Flagstaff Street, Colombo) – Naval Headquarters
SLNS Lanka (Welisara) -VNF HQ
SLNS Gemunu (Welisara) – Naval Barracks & Naval Detention Barracks
SLNS Mahasen (Welisara) – Logistic deport 
SLNS Tissa (Trincomalee)

Naval bases
SLN Dockyard (Trincomalee) – Eastern Naval Command HQ
SLNS Rangalla (Colombo Harbour, Colombo) – Western Naval Command HQ
SLNS Dakshina (Galle) – Southern Naval Command HQ
SLNS Ruhuna (Tangalle)
SLNS Vijaya (Kalpitiya Fort, Kalpitiya, Puttlam)
SLNS Elara (Karainagar, Jaffna) – Northern Naval Command HQ
SLNS Thammanna (Talaimannar)
SLNS Uttara (Kankasanturai, Jaffna)

Training establishments
Naval and Maritime Academy (SLN Dockyard, Trincomalee)
SLNS Thakshila (Welisara) – Naval Artificer Training Institute
SLNS Nipuna (Boossa) – Advanced Naval Training Centre 
SLNS Shilpa (Kandy) – Naval Recruit Training Centre 
SLNS Shiksha (Poonewa) – Naval Recruit Training Centre 
SLNS Pandukabaya – Naval Recruit Training Centre/Combat Training School

Land based naval contingents
SLNS Walagamba
SLNS Gajaba 
SLNS Agbo (Madangal)
SLNS Vijayaba 
SLNS Kanchadewa (Kayts and Velani)
SLNS Velusumana (Mandathivu)
SLNS Gotaimbara (Punguduthivu)
SLNS Perakumba (Sampur, Trincomalee)
SLNS Vasaba (Delft Island) 
SLNS Pussadeva (Vankalai)
SLNS Theraputta (Shilawathura) 
SLNS Bharana (Mullikulam)

Harbour defence units
SLNS Mahaweli (SLN Dockyard, Trincomalee)
SLNS Kelani (Colombo Harbour, Colombo)

Former shore establishments
HMCyS Rangalla (Diyatalawa)
HMCyS Parakrama 2 (Trincomalee)
HMCyS Gemunu 2 (Kochchikade, Colombo)
HMCyS Kalaru

See also
List of Sri Lanka Army equipment
List of Sri Lanka Air Force active aircraft

References

External links & sources 
Sri Lank Navy website
Defenders of the ocean receive heroes’ welcome on their triumphant return to home base
Sri Lanka Navy destroys the 10th LTTE arms ship 1700 km off Dondra
lankanavy.blogspot.com

Shore Establishments
Sri Lanka
Navy